Agamede  (Ancient Greek: Ἀγαμήδη means ‘very cunning’) was a name attributed to two separate women in classical Greek mythology and legendary history.

 Agamede ( twelfth century BC) was, according to Homer, a Greek physician acquainted with the healing powers of all the plants that grow upon the earth. She was born in Elis, a princess as the eldest daughter of Augeas, King of the Epeans, and was married to Mulius, the first man killed in battle by Nestor during a war between Elis and Pylos. Hyginus makes her the mother of Actor and Dictys by Poseidon.  She was called Perimede by both Propertius and Theocritus. By the Hellenistic period (c. 4th to 1st centuries BC), Agamede had become a sorceress-figure, much like Circe or Medea.
 Agamede, a princess of Lesbos as the daughter of King Macar and sister to Methymna, Mytilene, Antissa, Arisbe and Issa eponyms also of the cities at Lesbos. Her brothers were Cydrolaus, Neandrus, Leucippus and Eresus. From Agamede, a place in Lesbos, was believed to have derived its name. The town of Agamede had already disappeared in Pliny's day. Ancient Agamede has been identified recently with the ancient ruins on a small hill called "Vounaros" 3 km north of ancient Pyrrha.

Notes

References 

 Bell, Robert E., Women of Classical Mythology: A Biographical Dictionary. ABC-Clio. 1991. .
Diodorus Siculus, The Library of History translated by Charles Henry Oldfather. Twelve volumes. Loeb Classical Library. Cambridge, Massachusetts: Harvard University Press; London: William Heinemann, Ltd. 1989. Vol. 3. Books 4.59–8. Online version at Bill Thayer's Web Site
Diodorus Siculus, Bibliotheca Historica. Vol 1-2. Immanel Bekker. Ludwig Dindorf. Friedrich Vogel. in aedibus B. G. Teubneri. Leipzig. 1888-1890. Greek text available at the Perseus Digital Library.
Gaius Julius Hyginus, Fabulae from The Myths of Hyginus translated and edited by Mary Grant. University of Kansas Publications in Humanistic Studies. Online version at the Topos Text Project.
 Graves, Robert, The Greek Myths: The Complete and Definitive Edition. Penguin Books Limited. 2017. 
Homer, The Iliad with an English Translation by A.T. Murray, Ph.D. in two volumes. Cambridge, MA., Harvard University Press; London, William Heinemann, Ltd. 1924. Online version at the Perseus Digital Library.
 Homer, Homeri Opera in five volumes. Oxford, Oxford University Press. 1920. Greek text available at the Perseus Digital Library.
 Pliny the Elder, The Natural History. John Bostock, M.D., F.R.S. H.T. Riley, Esq., B.A. London. Taylor and Francis, Red Lion Court, Fleet Street. 1855. Online version at the Perseus Digital Library.
 Pliny the Elder, Naturalis Historia. Karl Friedrich Theodor Mayhoff. Lipsiae. Teubner. 1906. Latin text available at the Perseus Digital Library.
 Sextus Propertius, Elegies from Charm. Vincent Katz. trans. Los Angeles. Sun & Moon Press. 1995. Online version at the Perseus Digital Library. Latin text available at the same website.
 Theocritus, Idylls from The Greek Bucolic Poets translated by Edmonds, J M. Loeb Classical Library Volume 28. Cambridge, MA. Harvard University Press. 1912. Online version at theoi.com
 Theocritus, Idylls edited by R. J. Cholmeley, M.A. London. George Bell & Sons. 1901. Greek text available at the Perseus Digital Library.

Ancient Greek women
Greek mythological witches
Characters in the Iliad
Elean characters in Greek mythology